Per Rock is a rock lying 0.8 nautical miles (1.5 km) north of Pal Rock in the Arkticheskiy Institut Rocks, at the northwest extremity of the Wohlthat Mountains of Queen Maud Land. Discovered and photographed by the German Antarctic Expedition, 1938–39. Mapped by Norway from air photos and surveys by Norwegian Antarctic Expedition, 1956–60, and named Per (Peter).

Rock formations of Queen Maud Land
Princess Astrid Coast